Francis Grasso (March 25, 1948 – March 20, 2001) was an American disco music disc jockey from New York City, best known for being one of the first people to beatmatch.

Grasso, who attended Brooklyn Technical High School and Long Island University, started his DJ career in 1967—1968 at New York nightclub Salvation II. When the primary DJ Terry Noel failed to show up on time one night, the owners offered Grasso a chance at the job.  The crowd responded almost immediately and soon he had his first regular gig. It was there and at subsequent New York clubs such as Tarots and his most famous nightclub, Sanctuary — a former German Baptist church at 43rd Street & 9th Avenue (featured in the movie Klute) — where Grasso perfected his craft.

The most impressive addition Grasso brought to DJ culture was music programming, or the art of picking up on the energy of the crowd and sending that energy right back to them via the next track. Early on, Grasso used Thorens turntables although they were a far cry from the Technics turntables most DJs use in clubs today. Soon he taught others and Grasso spread the art of mixing by maintaining a constant beat and working the crowd with the music throughout New York.

Though he died in March 2001, the skills and techniques he pioneered remain the foundation of what is heard in a modern nightclub. Francis was interviewed in Josell Ramos' 2003 feature-length documentary Maestro.

Musical stylings
DJ Francis completely changed the game of Disco music. Before him, DJs submitted to what the patrons wanted, supplying recognizable music that would appeal to the crowd. Occasionally, DJs would add a different spin on top of these popular charts. DJ Francis wasn’t interested in what the customers wanted, and instead provided a new, exotic array of songs, which the crowd would not have thought to ask for. He offered a full, creative performance with a narrative. He demonstrated to the DJs of later generations that the power belonged to them to create environmental moods, and that there were techniques for creating different atmospheres, and thus manipulating dancers.

His musical choices were also quite different from his predecessors. He played on the funkier side of rock music, using The Rolling Stones or Led Zeppelin on top of heavy black rhythms such as Dyke & The Blazers or Kool & The Gang. He introduced drum-heavy African sounds, and used Latin beats to entice people to dance, as well as James Brown and Motown (including The Four Tops, The Supremes, and the Temptations).

Cultural Significance
While DJing at the Sanctuary, a New York dance club known as "the first totally uninhibited gay discothèque in America," Grasso was known for the danceability of his musical work. On nights when he was DJing, doormen were known to stop counting entrances of audience members after they got to the thousands, even though the Sanctuary had a capacity of 346 people. Being a safe haven for newly sexually liberated gay men and women, DJ Francis's music was the backdrop for recreational drug usage and promiscuity. With his long-held position at the Sanctuary, Grasso was able to develop his musical techniques and perfect his powers to mesmerize crowds.

References

Bibliography
 Goldman, Albert. Disco. New York: Hawthorne Books, 1979.

External links
 
 
 Rek-O-Kut (NYC manuf.) turntable details - used by Grasso

1948 births
2001 deaths
American DJs
American people of Italian descent
Club DJs
DJs from New York City
Radio personalities from New York City
20th-century American musicians
Brooklyn Technical High School alumni
Electronic dance music DJs